Sharpsburg is a town in Washington County, Maryland. Its population was 705 at the 2010 census.

During the American Civil War, the Battle of Antietam, sometimes referred to as the Battle of Sharpsburg, was fought on what is now Antietam National Battlefield, in the vicinity of Antietam Creek.

History

The first American of European descent to own land in what would eventually become Sharpsburg was the one-time indian trader Edmund Cartledge.  By the time Cartledge surveyed his "Hickory Tavern" land tract in 1737, the Great Philadelphia Wagon Road was already well established over the path that would become Sharpsburg's main street.  Hickory Tavern is noted in the patent as between the wagon road and Garrison Spring, today's Big Spring. Thousands of immigrants used this route of the wagon road traveling from Pennsylvania as far south as the Carolinas. 

On May 1, 1755, the road was used by Major general Edward Braddock, colonial governor Horatio Sharpe and several of Braddock's staff officers to reach Winchester, Virginia, while his 48th regiment took a longer route via today's Williamsport, Maryland. Among the officers accompanying Braddock that day was a young Virginia militia officer named George Washington. 

At the end of the French and Indian War in 1763, Joseph Chapline founded a town, naming it in honor of his friend Horatio Sharpe, the Proprietary Governor of the Province of Maryland. Its original settlers were mostly of German or Swiss origin reaching the area from Pennsylvania via the great wagon road. They were a major force in leading to an increase in wheat production from the original agricultural dependence on tobacco.

Located east of the Potomac River, Sharpsburg attracted industry in the early 19th century, especially after the Chesapeake and Ohio Canal was extended to Sharpsburg in 1836. The town was incorporated in 1832.

Sharpsburg gained national recognition during the American Civil War, when Confederate General Robert E. Lee invaded Maryland with his Army of Northern Virginia in the summer of 1862 and was intercepted near the city by Union General George B. McClellan with the Army of the Potomac. The rival armies met on September 17, in the Battle of Antietam (also called the Battle of Sharpsburg). It would be the bloodiest single day in all American military annals, with a total of nearly 23,000 casualties to both sides.  A few days earlier, the multi-sited Battle of South Mountain occurred at the three low-lying passes in South Mountain—Crampton's Gap, Turner's Gap, and Fox's Gap—where Lee's forces attempted to hold back the advancing Union regiments moving westward especially along the important National Road (now U.S. Route 40 Alternate) which is now a part of South Mountain State Battlefield Park.

The drawn battle is considered a turning point of the war, since it kept the Confederacy from winning a needed victory on Northern soil, which might have gained it European recognition. Lee's retreat gave Abraham Lincoln the opportunity he needed to issue his Emancipation Proclamation, declaring all slaves residing in rebelling Confederate territory against the federal government, to be free. This act made it even more unlikely that Europe would grant diplomatic recognition to the South.

Sharpsburg claims its Memorial Day commemoration as one of the first in the U.S., having their 147th consecutive celebration in 2014.

The town core was added to the National Register of Historic Places in 2008 as the Sharpsburg Historic District.  Also listed are the Antietam National Battlefield, William Chapline House, Good-Reilly House, William Hagerman Farmstead, Joseph C. Hays House, Jacob Highbarger House, Mount Airy, Piper House, Tolson's Chapel, Wilson-Miller Farm, and Woburn Manor.

The Antietam National Battlefield is an important source of local tourism and activities.

Government

Town Council
Elected by voters to four-year terms:
 Russ Weaver, Mayor (2020)
 Jacob Martz, Vice Mayor (2020)
 Ed Beeler
 Robbie Waters
 John Hammond
 Mia Parsons
 Joseph Kudla

Geography
Sharpsburg is located at  (39.457666, -77.749513).

Transportation

The primary means of travel to and from Sharpsburg is by road. The two main highways serving the town are Maryland Route 34, which follows Main Street, and Maryland Route 65, which ends at the intersection of Main Street and Church Street. MD 34 extends eastward to Boonsboro and continues westward to the Potomac River, where it crosses into Shepherdstown, West Virginia, as West Virginia Route 480. MD 65 proceeds northward to a junction with Interstate 70 and then continues to its terminus in Hagerstown.

Demographics

2010 census
As of the census of 2010, there were 705 people, 285 households, and 192 families living in the town. The racial makeup of the town was 95.7% White, 0.4% African American, 0.1% Native American, and 3.7% from two or more races. Hispanic or Latino of any race were 2.1% of the population.

There were 285 households, of which 28.1% had children under the age of 18 living with them, 47.7% were married couples living together, 13.0% had a female householder with no husband present, 6.7% had a male householder with no wife present, and 32.6% were non-families. 25.3% of all households were made up of individuals, and 7% had someone living alone who was 65 years of age or older. The average household size was 2.47 and the average family size was 2.92.

The median age in the town was 42.8 years. 20.3% of residents were under the age of 18; 7.3% were between the ages of 18 and 24; 26.4% were from 25 to 44; 33.2% were from 45 to 64; and 12.8% were 65 years of age or older. The gender makeup of the town was 50.9% male and 49.1% female.

2000 census
As of the census of 2000, there were 691 people, 286 households, and 193 families living in the town. The racial makeup of the town was 97.8% White, 0.4% African American, 0.6% Asian, 0.3% Hispanic or Latino, and 1.2% from two or more races.

There were 286 households, out of which 26.6% had children under the age of 18 living with them, 54.2% were married couples living together, 9.4% had a female householder with no husband present, and 32.5% were non-families. 26.2% of all households were made up of individuals, and 8.0% had someone living alone who was 65 years of age or older. The average household size was 2.42 and the average family size was 2.90.

In the town, the population was spread out, with 21.7% under the age of 18, 8.7% from 18 to 24, 29.1% from 25 to 44, 27.6% from 45 to 64, and 12.9% who were 65 years of age or older. The median age was 38 years. For every 100 females, there were 103.2 males. For every 100 females age 18 and over, there were 101.9 males.

The median income for a household in the town was $41,786, and the median income for a family was $52,875. Males had a median income of $37,500 versus $22,000 for females. The per capita income for the town was $20,917. About 1.1% of families and 3.1% of the population were below the poverty line, including none of those under age 18 and 5.6% of those age 65 or over.

Notable native
Howell G. Crim, civil servant (White House Chief Usher, 1938-57)

References

External links

 

 Maryland Municipal League: Sharpsburg
 War memorial in downtown Sharpsburg at "Sites of Memory"

 
German-American culture in Maryland
Towns in Maryland
Towns in Washington County, Maryland
Populated places established in 1763
Swiss-American culture in Maryland
1763 establishments in Maryland